Frontenac Motor Corporation was a joint venture of Louis Chevrolet, Indy 500 winner Joseph Boyer Jr., Indianapolis car dealer William Small, and Zenith Carburetor president Victor Heftler. Per articles of Incorporation on file in the Michigan State Archives, it was founded in Detroit in December 1915. The company focused on building high-performance automobiles that would be used in major AAA events, including the Indianapolis 500.

Gaston Chevrolet won the 1920 Indianapolis 500 in a Frontenac, but died a few months later in a late-season race in Los Angeles in November 1920; he had already accumulated enough points to posthumously win the championship. In 1921, Frontenac won the Indy 500 again, this time at the hands of Tommy Milton, and the company entered into a deal with Stutz Motor Company to build passenger cars. However, the deal quickly went wrong, and Frontenac Motors filed bankruptcy protection in 1923.

Other uses
There is a private organization of collectors of early automobiles calling itself the Frontenac Motor Corporation that appears to have no connection to the 1915 company.

References

External links
Chevrolet Builds Fords retrieved Jan 31, 2012
New York Times on the 1920 crash in which Gaston Chevrolet was killed
Library retrieved Jan 31, 2012
1921 Indianapolis 500 statistics retrieved Jan 31, 2012
Frontenac Racing History at ChevroletBrothers.com

Defunct motor vehicle manufacturers of the United States
Vehicle manufacturing companies disestablished in 1921
Vehicle manufacturing companies established in 1914
1914 establishments in Indiana
1921 disestablishments in Indiana
Motor vehicle manufacturers based in Indiana